Dimension is the second album by French singer and rapper K-Reen. It was released on October 29, 2001, through Tréma Music. The album also spawned three hit singles, "Prends Ma Main", "Oui-Non" and "Soirées Rétro".

Track listing

Charts

References

2001 albums
Hip hop albums by French artists